Sainte-Élisabeth is a municipality in the Lanaudière region of Quebec, Canada, part of the D'Autray Regional County Municipality.

Demographics
Population trend:
 Population in 2011: 1559 (2006 to 2011 population change: 8.3%)
 Population in 2006: 1440
 Population in 2001: 1474
 Population in 1996: 1559 (or 1564 when adjusted for 2001 boundaries)
 Population in 1991: 1508

Private dwellings occupied by usual residents: 601 (total dwellings: 628)

Mother tongue:
 English as first language: 0.75%
 French as first language: 98.5%
 English and French as first language: 0%
 Other as first language: 0.75%

Education

Commission scolaire des Samares operates francophone public schools, including:
 École Emmélie-Caron

The Sir Wilfrid Laurier School Board operates anglophone public schools, including:
 Joliette Elementary School in Saint-Charles-Borromée
 Joliette High School in Joliette

See also
List of municipalities in Quebec

References

External links

Sainte-Élisabeth - MRC d'Autray

Incorporated places in Lanaudière
Municipalities in Quebec